Choi Min-chul (born November 9, 1976) is a South Korean actor. He starred in film such as Way Back Home (2013) and The Throne (2015).

Filmography

Film

Television series

Theater

Musical

References

External links
 Choi Min-chul at 

1976 births
Living people
South Korean male television actors
South Korean male film actors
South Korean male stage actors
South Korean male musical theatre actors
Chung-Ang University alumni
People from Gwangju